Roman Legion-Hare is a 1955 Warner Bros. Looney Tunes animated short directed by Friz Freleng. The short was released on November 12, 1955, and stars Bugs Bunny and Yosemite Sam. The title is a play on the words Roman Legionnaire. After being ordered by Emperor Nero to find a victim to be tossed to the lions, Yosemite Sam tries to capture Bugs Bunny.

Plot
The setting is Rome, 54 A. D.; the camera pans past a billboard announcing "Another Appian Freeway for Your Safety (Slow Chariots Keep Right)" before settling on an exterior view of the Coliseum. As spectators file into the Coliseum, their shadows fall on a poster describing the day's sporting event: "Detroit Lions in Season Opener — Undefeated Lions out for First Taste of Victory". The sign is a reference to the NFL team with the same name, which was a league powerhouse at the time. The NFL Lions had appeared in the league championship game in the three seasons prior to the short being released, winning the title in 1952 and 1953.

A radio-style sportscaster describes the scene for his audience and the entrance of Emperor Nero into the arena (in a chariot with tail fins from a 1950s Cadillac). Nero is represented as a caricature of actor Charles Laughton who had played the character in  The Sign of the Cross in 1932. The announcer reports that Nero has "consented to throw out the first victim". When it turns out they are all out of victims, Nero commands Captain of the Praetorian Guard Sam to take his legion out to get one right away informing Sam that if he fails to provide a victim for the lions, Sam will be the victim. Along the way, Sam and the legion (which looks more like a squad) cross paths with Bugs Bunny who is looking at them expecting a parade. Sam sends his troops after Bugs. but he trips them up with his foot. Sam then chases after Bugs in a chariot where he once again is a victim of the "giddyap mule!/whoa mule!" routine.

Through the rest of the picture, Sam and Bugs are running through the labyrinth of the Coliseum where the lions seem to be lurking behind every other door. Sam ends up near a lion's cage and is startled when it roars loudly, for which it gets clobbered over the head. Seeing this, Bugs turns a wheel which opens the cage and the now-freed lion roars again. Sam starts whacking it again, but slows and halts as he realizes the situation: "How many times do I have to tell.... you.. to.. shut... up?". Sam barely escapes by putting a locked door between him and the angry predator only for the lion to grab the rug underneath him and pull him under the door to attack him. Yosemite then chases Bugs into a large underground room, full of sleeping lions. Sam unknowingly follows him in and sees Bugs sneaking toward the ladder. Bugs gets out and lowers an alarm clock on a rope through a grate into the room, which wakes the lions who attack Sam as he escapes.

He then nears a pit of lions with Bugs at the other side ("How now, brown cow?"). As Sam makes his way across with stilts ("No long-eared galoot can outfox the Captain of the Guards!"), Bugs gives the lions some axes and saws which they use to cut the stilts down and attack Sam as he tries to get back to the other side.

Bugs finally escapes, but accidentally gets himself in the middle of the arena. Sam victoriously joins Nero in his box as the lions are released. The lions run by Bugs who quickly protects himself and straight to Sam and Nero who take refuge atop a tall column. Bugs puts on a Roman crown and says "Well, as the Romans say, E Pluribus Uranium". As the enraged lions slowly chop down the column piece by piece in order to attack Nero and Sam, Nero plays "Taps" on his fiddle as he and Sam await their fate, with the cartoon fading to black.

Trivia
Parts of this film were re-used from Ain't She Tweet in 1952 and it was also reused in the Friz Freleng short film Devil's Feud Cake in 1963.

The single lion that made a ruckus in its cage was somewhat reused in the 1957 cartoon Tweet Zoo.

In The Sylvester and Tweety Mysteries episode "Yelp", each scene is a homage to the short. (e.g. Sylvester sprays a caged dog with water and does it again after Tweety opens the cage)

Home media
Roman Legion Hare was released on the Bugs Bunny's Wacky Adventures VHS as part of the Golden Jubilee 24 Carrot Collection video set. The short is also part of the Looney Tunes Golden Collection: Volume 4 DVD set.

See also
Looney Tunes
Looney Tunes and Merrie Melodies filmography (1950–1959)
List of Bugs Bunny cartoons
List of Yosemite Sam cartoons

References

External links

1955 films
1955 animated films
1955 short films
1950s Warner Bros. animated short films
Looney Tunes shorts
Animated films about rabbits and hares
Animated films about lions
Short films directed by Friz Freleng
Films set in the 1st century
Films set in ancient Rome
Films set in the Roman Empire
Depictions of Nero on film
Films scored by Milt Franklyn
Bugs Bunny films
Yosemite Sam films